Spherical Tokamak for Energy Production (STEP) is a spherical tokamak fusion plant concept proposed by the United Kingdom Atomic Energy Authority and funded by UK government. The project is a proposed DEMO-class successor device to the ITER tokamak proof-of-concept of a fusion plant, the most advanced tokamak fusion reactor to date, which is scheduled to achieve a 'burning plasma' in 2035. STEP aims to produce net electricity from fusion on a timescale of 2040. Jacob Rees-Mogg, the UK Secretary of State for Business, Energy and Industrial Strategy, announced West Burton A power station in Nottinghamshire as its site on 3 October 2022 during the Conservative Party Conference. A coal-fired power station at the site ceased production a few days earlier.

Plans
In September 2019, the United Kingdom announced a planned £200-million (US$248-million) investment to produce a design for STEP. The funding covers the initial five year concept design phase, while the total capital costs are estimated to be several billion pounds. STEP should be operational by the early 2040s.

The planned UK facility is based on a ‘tokamak’ design that uses magnetic fields to confine a plasma of heavy isotopes of hydrogen, tritium and deuterium, which fuse under extreme heat and pressure. STEP would be a variant on the basic tokamak, a spherical tokamak that holds the plasma in a cored-apple shape. UKAEA's MAST Upgrade spherical tokamak device started operation in October 2020, and will heavily inform the STEP design. This greatly reduces the cost, but also puts higher stress on the applied materials.

The construction of STEP is designed to occur over three phases. The first phase, from 2019 to 2024, should create an integrated concept design for the reactor together with a strategy to amass an intellectual property portfolio and manage technical risks. Additionally, it will locate a UK site and establish the operational framework for the venture. The second phase, from 2025 to 2032, will develop the engineering design, including testing and optimizing subsystems, at which stage the STEP site will begin to see a range of engineering activities. In the third phase, from 2032 to 2040, the SPR will be constructed and commissioned.

Goals and objectives 

According to the UK AEA, STEP is designed to complement, not replace, private-sector development of fusion through synergies such as providing an enhanced research suite of facilities, an integrated design framework which can both inform private-sector activities and serve to solicit a private-sector supply chain of components and subsystems, a UK regulatory framework for fusion, and the training of a national fusion workforce.

The STEP program is designed to achieve the following objectives: Deliver outputs to help inform a fusion regulatory framework
 Stimulate commercial investment
 Innovate, creating solutions that find near term applications in adjacent sectors
 Stimulate growth of the fusion energy supply chain through partnering
 Nurture skills in a diverse and inclusive way, training those who will deliver fusion power and supporting skills growth in adjacent sectors
 Support industry to develop designs for a first commercial fleet of fusion reactors to follow the SPR [STEP Prototype Reactor]
 Develop the new STEP site and associated infrastructure

See also
 Mega Ampere Spherical Tokamak, built in UK, and upgraded
 ITER, (originally the International Thermonuclear Experimental Reactor), under construction

References

External links
 Spherical Tokamak for Energy Production on the Culham Centre for Fusion Energy website

Bassetlaw District
Buildings and structures in Nottinghamshire
Nuclear power in the United Kingdom
Nuclear research institutes in the United Kingdom
Proposed fusion reactors
Science and technology in Nottinghamshire
Tokamaks